Epiphyas sobrina is a species of moth of the family Tortricidae. It is found in Australia, where it has been recorded from Queensland.

The wingspan is about 15.5 mm.

References

Moths described in 1945
Epiphyas